Carl Einar Hille (28 June 1894 – 12 February 1980) was an American  mathematics professor and scholar. Hille authored or coauthored twelve mathematical books and a number of mathematical papers.

Early life and education
Hille was born in New York City. His parents were both immigrants from Sweden who separated before his birth. His father, Carl August Heuman, was a civil engineer.  He was brought up by his mother, Edla Eckman, who took the surname Hille. When Einar was two years old, he and his mother returned to Stockholm. Hille spent the next 24 years of his life in Sweden, returning to the United States when he was 26 years old. Hille entered the University of Stockholm in 1911. Hille was awarded his first degree in mathematics in 1913 and the equivalent of a master's degree in the following year. He received a Ph.D. from Stockholm in 1918 for a doctoral dissertation entitled Some Problems Concerning Spherical Harmonics.

Career
In 1919 Hille was awarded the Mittag-Leffler Prize and was given the right to teach at the University of Stockholm. He subsequently taught at Harvard University, Princeton University, Stanford University and the University of Chicago. In 1933, he became an endowed professor on mathematics in the Graduate School of Yale University, retiring in 1962.

Hille's main work was on integral equations, differential equations, special functions, Dirichlet series and Fourier series. Later in his career his interests turned more towards functional analysis. His name persists among others in the Hille–Yosida theorem. Hille was a member of the London Mathematical Society and the Circolo Matematico di Palermo. Hille served as president of the American Mathematical Society (1947–48) and was the Society's Colloquium lecturer in 1944. He received many honours including election to the United States National Academy of Sciences (1953) and the Swedish Royal Academy of Sciences. He was awarded by Sweden with the Order of the Polar Star.

Personal life

Hille was married to Kirsti Ore Hille  (1906–2001) in 1937, sister of Norwegian mathematician Øystein Ore. They had two sons, Harald and Bertil Hille.

Works
with Ralph Phillips: Functional Analysis and Semi-Groups. 1948, 1957.
Analytic Function Theory. 2 vols., 1959, 1964.
Analysis. 2 vols., 1964, 1966.
Lectures on Ordinary Differential Equations. 1969.
Methods in Classical and Functional Analysis. 1972.
Ordinary Differential Equations in the Complex Domain. 1976.
In Retrospect. Mathematical Intelligencer, Vol.3, 1980/81, No.1, pp. 3–13.

References

Other sources

External links
 

1894 births
1980 deaths
20th-century American mathematicians
Mathematical analysts
American people of Swedish descent
Members of the United States National Academy of Sciences
Order of the Polar Star
Stockholm University alumni
Presidents of the American Mathematical Society
Members of the Royal Swedish Academy of Sciences